The Bandy World Championship for youth teams is a group of sports tournaments held for bandy athletes competing for their junior national teams. There are four different age classes for boys and young men and one age class for girls. The tournaments are governed by the Federation of International Bandy.

Age classes

The following tournaments are held regularly:
World Championship G17 – for girls' teams up to age 17
G17 is sometimes written as F17 and the Y designations may also be written with a U
World Championship Y15 – for boys' teams up to age 15
World Championship Y17 – for boys' teams up to age 17
World Championship Y19 – for young men's teams up to age 19
World Championship Y23 – for young men's teams up to age 23

G17

The first World Championship G17 was held in 2009 and it has since been held every other year.

G17 Champions
 2009  Russia
 2011  Sweden
 2013  Sweden
 2015  Sweden
 2017  Sweden
 2019  Sweden

Y15
The first World Championship Y16 was held in 1994. Starting with 2002, it has been for Y15 teams since. The 2020 World Championship Y15 tournament in Arkhangelsk, Russia, was cancelled.

Y15 Champions

 1994  Sweden
 1995  Russia
 1996  Finland
 1998  Sweden
 2002  Russia
 2004  Finland
 2006  Sweden
 2008  Russia
 2010  Sweden
 2012  Russia
 2014  Russia
 2016  Russia
 2018  Russia
 2020 Cancelled

Y17
The first World Championship Y17 was held in 1975, the next in 1979. It is worth noting, that the Soviet Union took part in both 1975 and 1979 but did not win a medal until the third installment in 1981. In 1995 and 1997 it was Y18 teams instead of Y17.

Y17 Champions

 1975  Sweden
 1979  Finland
 1981  Sweden
 1983  Soviet Union
 1985  Sweden
 1987  Soviet Union
 1989  Sweden
 1991  Sweden
 1993  Sweden
 1995  Sweden
 1997  Russia
 1999  Sweden
 2001  Sweden
 2003  Russia
 2005  Russia
 2007  Russia
 2009  Russia
 2011  Russia
 2013  Finland
 2015  Russia
 2016  Russia
 2017  Russia
 2018  Sweden
 2019  Russia
 2020  Russia
 2021  
 2022  
 2023  Sweden

Y19

World Championship Y19 has been held biannually since 1968. In 1994 and 1996 it was Y20 teams instead.

Y19 Champions

 1968  Sweden
 1970  Soviet Union
 1972  Sweden
 1974  Soviet Union
 1976  Soviet Union
 1978  Sweden
 1980  Soviet Union
 1982  Sweden
 1984  Sweden
 1986  Soviet Union
 1988  Sweden
 1990  Sweden
 1992  Sweden
 1994  Russia
 1996  Sweden
 1998  Russia
 2000  Sweden
 2002  Sweden
 2004  Russia
 2006  Sweden
 2008  Russia
 2010  Sweden
 2012  Russia
 2014  Russia
 2016  Sweden
 2017  Russia
 2018  Russia
 2019  Russia
 2020  Russia
 2021  
 2022  
 2023  Sweden

Y23

World Championship Y23 were held in 1990 and in 1992, but then the next was not held until 2011. In 2016, 2017 and 2019 it was Y21 teams instead.

Y23 Champions
 1990  Soviet Union
 1992  Sweden
 2011  Russia
 2013  Russia
 2016  Sweden
 2017  Sweden
 2019  Russia

See also
 Bandy World Championship G-17
 Bandy World Championship Y-19
 Bandy World Championship Y-21
 Bandy World Championship
 Women's Bandy World Championship

References

 
World Championships youth
Bandy
Bandy